Stephanie Klemons (born September 27, 1982) is an American Broadway performer and choreographer. She is the Associate Choreographer and Original Dance Captain of the Broadway musical Hamilton. She was also an original cast member and the Dance Captain of In the Heights and If/Then with Idina Menzel.

Early life 
Klemons was born in Manhattan at Mount Sinai Hospital. She grew up in Colts Neck Township, New Jersey and graduated from Marlboro High School in 2000, where she was inducted into the National Honor Society. In high school, she would spend time after school tutoring students when she wasn't choreographing a number for the pep rally or taking dance class.

She went to Rutgers University on scholarship and double majored in Genetics & Microbio Research and Modern Dance. Her undergraduate work in Cancer Research led to the publication of this study, in the International Journal of Oncology. After graduating from Rutgers in 2004 she moved to Spain for four months to get a “Study Abroad Experience”. She taught English to some children and lived with their family in Pozuelo de Alarcón, just outside Madrid and also stayed in a small village named Oropesa.

Dance 
Klemons attended Gallery of Dance until she was 11, and remained there after she moved, but the traveling was not working for her family, so after looking for a new school they landed on one in town. She began attending Colts Neck Dance & Performing Arts Academy with three other girls. Once she reached high school she and a friend would travel regularly into Manhattan to take class at S.T.E.P.S with Roberta, Broadway Dance Center, and Studio Maestro with Luigi.

Awards

Albums
BC/EFA Carols For a Cure (2008)
In The Heights (2009)
BC/EFA Carols For a Cure (2009)
Justin Imperiale “Passion” (2010)
If/Then (2014)
BC/EFA Carols For a Cure (2014)
BC/EFA Carols For a Cure (2015)
Hamilton (Grammy Winner/Triple Platinum) (2016)

Broadway

In the Heights
Bring It On
If/Then
Hamilton

References

External links 
 

1982 births
Living people
Rutgers University alumni
Dancers from New Jersey
Marlboro High School alumni
People from Colts Neck Township, New Jersey